Blandon is a census-designated place in Maidencreek Township, Berks County, Pennsylvania, United States.  It is located at the junction of Pennsylvania Route 73 and Park Road.  As of the 2010 census, the population was 7,152 residents.

History
A post office called Blandon has been in operation since 1862. Sources differ whether the community was named for H. Willis Bland, a county judge, or for Robert Bland, an original owner of the town site.

References

Census-designated places in Berks County, Pennsylvania
Census-designated places in Pennsylvania
1862 establishments in Pennsylvania